JoAnn Haysbert (née Wright)  is an American educator and academic administrator currently serving as Chancellor, Executive Vice-President and Provost of Hampton University in Hampton, Virginia. Previously, she served as Langston University’s fifteenth and first female president, from 2005 to 2011, making her the first African-American female president of any institution of higher learning in the state of Oklahoma.

Career
After receiving her Ed.D from Auburn University, Haysbert held academic positions at the school, and also Virginia State University and Alexander City State Junior College, before her tenure at Hampton.  At the historic, private "Black Ivy", she served in a variety of positions including its first acting president, provost, assistant provost, professor, coordinator of graduate programs, dean of freshman studies, assistant vice president for academic affairs, director of summer sessions, and director of the assessment and learning support center.

In 2005, after a 25-year career at Hampton, she succeeded Earnest Holloway to become Langston University's 15th president, serving through the end of 2011, when Kent Smith succeeded the post.

In 2012, she returned to Hampton to become its first Chancellor and Executive Vice-President, while also resuming her post as Provost.

Biography
Born in Kingstree, South Carolina, in 1948, Haysbert is a graduate of Johnson C. Smith University (where she pledged Alpha Kappa Alpha, the first black college sorority in the U.S.), Auburn University, and Harvard Graduate School of Education’s Institute for Educational Management.

She married Stanley Haysbert, a real estate developer (brother of actor Dennis Haysbert and nephew of businessman Raymond V. Haysbert), in 1980, and has five children.

References

1948 births
Living people
Hampton University faculty
People from Kingstree, South Carolina
African-American academics
American academic administrators
American women academics
Women heads of universities and colleges
African-American educators
Heads of universities and colleges in the United States
21st-century African-American people
21st-century African-American women
20th-century African-American people
20th-century African-American women